Marie-Eve Proulx is a Canadian politician, who was elected to the National Assembly of Quebec in the 2018 provincial election. She represents the electoral district of Côte-du-Sud as a member of the Coalition Avenir Québec and served as the Minister for Regional Economic Development from October 18, 2018 until her resignation on May 4, 2021 following several harassment complaints from her cabinet staff.

References

Living people
Coalition Avenir Québec MNAs
21st-century Canadian politicians
Women MNAs in Quebec
Members of the Executive Council of Quebec
Women government ministers of Canada
Year of birth missing (living people)
21st-century Canadian women politicians